Elections to the Grand Council of Basel-Stadt were held on 23 October 2016.  The big winners were the Liberal Party of Basel-Stadt, who increased their popular vote from 9.6% in 2012 to 13.8% and gaining four additional seats. Both centre-left parties, the Social Democrats and the Green Party also gained ground and won one additional seat each. The losers of the elections were the centrist Christian Democratic People's Party, which lost one seat, the Green Liberal Party who lost one seat and the FDP who lost two seats; the right-wing anti-immigration party "Volksaktion" lost both of their seats.

Opinion polls

References

2016
2016 in Switzerland
2016 elections in Switzerland